Nuclear receptor-interacting protein 2 is a protein that in humans is encoded by the NRIP2 gene.

References

Further reading